The 1994 Men's Ice Hockey World Championships was the 58th such event sanctioned by the International Ice Hockey Federation (IIHF). Teams representing 35 countries participated in several levels of competition, with an additional two national teams failing to advance from a mid-season preliminary qualifying tournament. The competition also served as qualifications for group placements in the 1995 competition.

The top Championship Group A tournament took place in Italy from 25 April to 8 May 1994, with games played in Bolzano, Canazei and Milan. Twelve teams took part, with the first round being split into two groups of six, with the four best teams from each group advancing to the quarter finals. Canada beat Finland in a shootout to capture gold for the first time since 1961. This was Canada's 20th world title in ice hockey.

Great Britain returned to Group A for the first time since 1962, but failed to even earn a point.  Slovakia, Belarus, Croatia, and Estonia all debuted in Group C, the Slovaks winning the top group, the Estonians winning the bottom group that would be called Group D in two years.

World Championship Group A (Italy)

First round

Group 1

Group 2 

American Bill Lindsay tested positive for efedrin so official records indicate a final score of 7–0, however they also still add the two goals into the team totals.

Playoff round

Quarterfinals

Consolation round 11–12 place

Semifinals

Match for third place

Final

World Championship Group B (Denmark)
Played in Copenhagen and Aalborg 7–17 April.  As in Group C1, a two to one score on the final day sealed victory over a former Soviet nation.  This time Switzerland narrowly defeated Latvia.

Switzerland was promoted to Group A while China was relegated to Group C1.

World Championship Group C1 (Slovakia)
Played in Poprad and Spišská Nová Ves 18–27 March.  The hosts, shortly after losing in the quarterfinals of the Olympics, were expected to have a relatively easy time playing in Group C.  However, all three former Soviet republics gave them very tough games, and prevailing by a single goal in the final game sealed their victory.  North Korea was supposed to be the eighth team in this tournament, but did not participate.

Slovakia was promoted to Group B while absent North Korea was relegated to Group C2

World Championship Group C2 (Spain)

Qualifying round 
Played in November 1993.  Two groups played to qualify for the final two spots in Spain.

Group 1 (Estonia/Lithuania)

Group 2 (Croatia) 
Played in Zagreb

Croatia and Estonia qualified for Group C2.

First round 
Played in Barcelona

Group 1

Group 2

Final Round 28–31 Place 

Estonia was promoted to Group C1

Consolation round 32–35 place

Ranking and statistics

Tournament awards
Best players selected by the directorate:
Best Goaltender:       Bill Ranford
Best Defenceman:       Magnus Svensson
Best Forward:          Paul Kariya
Media All-Star Team:
Goaltender:  Bill Ranford
Defence:  Timo Jutila,  Magnus Svensson
Forwards:  Paul Kariya,  Saku Koivu,  Jari Kurri

Final standings
The final standings of the tournament according to IIHF:

Scoring leaders
List shows the top skaters sorted by points, then goals.
Source:

Leading goaltenders
Only the top five goaltenders, based on save percentage, who have played 50% of their team's minutes are included in this list.
Source:

See also
1994 World Junior Ice Hockey Championships
1994 IIHF Women's World Championship

Citations

References
Complete results

1994
World Championships,1994,Men
Sport in Bolzano
Sports competitions in Milan
March 1994 sports events in Europe
April 1994 sports events in Europe
May 1994 sports events in Europe
World Championships,1994,Men
1994 Ice Hockey World Championships,Men
World Championships,1994,Men
World Championships,1994,Men
World Championships,1994,Men
World Championships,1994,Men
World Championships,1994,Men
World Championships,1994,Men
Sport in Aalborg
1994 World Championships,1994,Men
International sports competitions in Copenhagen
Sport in Poprad
Spišská Nová Ves
1993 in Catalan sport
1994 Ice Hockey World Championships,Men
Sports competitions in Barcelona